Blake Anthony Foster (born May 29, 1985) is an American actor and martial artist.

History 
Foster was the Huggies baby at the age of 16 months in 1986. In 1995, he was one of the stars in the movie Above Suspicion starring  Christopher Reeve, Joe Mantegna and Kim Cattrall. He is perhaps best known for his role as Justin Stewart, the child who assumed the mantle of the Blue Turbo Ranger in the fifth season of Fox Kids' Power Rangers Turbo, making his debut for the show in the film Turbo: A Power Rangers Movie. Foster reprised the role in an episode of Power Rangers In Space.

In the same time, he was starred in two successful movies Casper Meets Wendy (1998) and Rusty: A Dog's Tale (1998).

In 2017, he starred in the short film The Order, along with Power Rangers allumni Austin St. John, Catherine Sutherland, David Yost, Johnny Yong Bosch, Paul Schrier, Karan Ashley, Steve Cardenas, Erin Cahill, Walter Emanuel Jones, Nakia Burrise, Hilary Shepard Turner, Dan Southworth, Alyson Sullivan, Deborah Estelle Phillips and Azim Rizk.

Filmography

Film
 Street Knight (1993) .... (uncredited)
 Above Suspicion (1995) .... Damon Cain
 Turbo: A Power Rangers Movie (1997) .... Justin Stewart (Blue Turbo Ranger)
 Casper Meets Wendy (1998) .... Josh Jackson
 Rusty: A Dog's Tale (1998) .... Jory
 Kids World (2001) .... Ryan Mitchell
 Drifter TKD (2008) .... Jesse Tyler
 A Life Untitled (2015) .... Jimmy's Boss (V.O.)
 The Order (2017) .... Mason

TV
 Beverly Hills, 90210
 Episode: "Midlife... Now What?" (1993).... Kevin
 Family Album (1994) .... Young Lionel (uncredited)
 Boy Meets World
 Episode: "The Pink Flamingo Kid" (1996) .... Danny
 Power Rangers Turbo (1997, 45 episodes) .... Justin Stewart (Blue Turbo Ranger) / Robot Justin
 Power Rangers In Space (1998, Episode: "True Blue to the Rescue") .... Justin Stewart (Blue Turbo Ranger)
 Power Rangers: The Lost Episode (1999)...Justin Stewart (special episode/archival footage)
 Walker, Texas Ranger
 Episode: "The Children of Halloween" (1998).... Joey Williams
 Two of a Kind
 Episode: "Carrie Moves In" (1999) .... Carter
 The Brady Bunch in the White House (2002, TV Movie) .... Peter Brady
 Skater Boys (2006) .... Mike
 Episode: "Sundown"
 Episode: "Sex and Candy"
 What's Stevie Thinking? (2007, TV Pilot).... Mark Lanalampi

Voice
 Turbo: A Power Rangers Movie (1997) .... Justin Stewart (When Morphed)
 Power Rangers Turbo (1997) .... Justin Stewart (When Morphed) / Blue Shadow Ranger
 Power Rangers In Space (1998) .... Justin Stewart (When Morphed)

Awards

References

External links

1985 births
Male actors from California
American male child actors
American male film actors
American tang soo do practitioners
American male television actors
Living people